Francis Joseph O'Brien (April 17, 1936October 21, 1999) was an American football offensive tackle in the National Football League (NFL) who played for the Cleveland Browns (1959), the Washington Redskins (1960–66) and the Pittsburgh Steelers (1966–68).  He played college football at Michigan State University.

Early life
O'Brien was born in Springfield, Massachusetts and raised in Holyoke, Massachusetts, where attended Holyoke High School.

College career
O'Brien attended and played college football at Michigan State University.

Professional career
O'Brien was selected in the third round (35th overall) of the 1959 NFL Draft by the Cleveland Browns.  After playing for the Browns for one season, he was traded to the Washington Redskins and played for Washington from 1960 to 1966.  In 1966, he was traded to the Pittsburgh Steelers, where he played for three seasons.

Restaurant business
After retiring from football, O'Brien owned and operated restaurants in Annapolis, Maryland, Washington, D. C., and Rehoboth Beach, Delaware.

Personal life
O'Brien married to his wife, Elizabeth, in 1965 and they had two children.  He died on October 21, 1999, of a heart attack at George Washington University Hospital in Washington, D. C.

References

External links
 
 O'Brien's Steakhouse

1936 births
1999 deaths
Sportspeople from Springfield, Massachusetts
Players of American football from Massachusetts
American football offensive tackles
Michigan State Spartans football players
Cleveland Browns players
Washington Redskins players
Pittsburgh Steelers players